Frans Åke Theodor Nauman (28 March 1908 – 18 May 1995) was a Swedish water polo goalkeeper. He competed at the 1936 Summer Olympics and finished in seventh place. His father Theodor was also a water polo goalkeeper.

See also
 Sweden men's Olympic water polo team records and statistics
 List of men's Olympic water polo tournament goalkeepers

References

External links
 

1908 births
1995 deaths
Swedish male water polo players
Water polo goalkeepers
Olympic water polo players of Sweden
Water polo players at the 1936 Summer Olympics
Stockholms KK water polo players
Sportspeople from Stockholm